Barkheda and/or Barkhera may refer to the following entities in India :

Madhya Pradesh, Central India 
 Barkheda, Bhopal, a locality in the Bhopal city 
 Barkheda, Raisen, a village in the Obedullaganj block of Raisen District

Uttar Pradesh, Northern India 
 Barkhera, a town in Pilibhit district of India

See also